Stories of Scotland is a non-fiction history podcast hosted by Jenny Johnstone and Annie MacDonald. Created in 2019, the podcast discusses Scottish history and folklore using archival research.

Overview 
The podcast was created in July 2019 by environmental scientist Jenny Johnstone and archivist Annie MacDonald and is recorded in the Highlands of Scotland. The podcast discusses Scottish heritage and culture often using archival sources and oral histories to highlight lesser known stories. For LGBT History Month 2021, the podcast released a mini-series retelling Highland folklore with an LGBT twist funded by the Edwin Morgan Trust.

Reception 
The podcast was shortlisted for the Smartest Podcast category of the British Podcast Awards 2021. In June 2021 the Scottish Parliament lodged a motion to congratulate the podcast on its nomination.

References

External links 
 Official website

2019 podcast debuts
British podcasts
History podcasts